Dame Kathleen Lonsdale  ( Yardley; 28 January 1903 – 1 April 1971) was an Irish-born British pacifist, prison reformer and crystallographer. She proved, in 1929, that the benzene ring is flat by using X-ray diffraction methods to elucidate the structure of hexamethylbenzene. She was the first to use Fourier spectral methods while solving the structure of hexachlorobenzene in 1931. During her career she attained several firsts for female scientists, including being one of the first two women elected a Fellow of the Royal Society (FRS) in 1945 (along with Marjory Stephenson), first woman tenured professor at University College London, first woman president of the International Union of Crystallography, and first woman president of the British Association for the Advancement of Science.

Early life and education
She was born Kathleen Yardley at Newbridge, County Kildare, Ireland, the tenth child of Harry Yardley, the town postmaster, and Jessie Cameron. Kathleen's family was not wealthy, and her father was an alcoholic. As the Irish unrest became more severe Kathleen's mother divorced her father and took the rest of the family to England. Her family moved to Seven Kings, Essex, England, when she was five years old. Kathleen attended Downshall Elementary school from 1908 to 1914. She studied at Ilford County High School for Girls, then transferred to Ilford County High School for Boys to study mathematics and science, because the girls' school did not offer these subjects. Kathleen had the highest score in physics that any student at London University ever had. She earned her Bachelor of Science degree from Bedford College for Women in 1922, graduating in physics with an MSc from University College London in 1924.

Career and research
In 1924 she joined the crystallography research team headed by William Henry Bragg at the Royal Institution. Following her marriage in 1927, she moved to the University of Leeds, but continued to correspond with Bragg. From 1929 to 1934, she started a family and largely stayed at home while continuing her work calculating structure factors. Her husband Thomas Lonsdale was a textile chemist who supported his wife's research. He encouraged his wife to work from home and to go back to work when offered. He worked at Silk Research Association in Leeds after they were married.

In 1934, Lonsdale returned to work with Bragg at the Royal Institution as a researcher. She was awarded a DSc from University of London in 1936 while at the Royal Institution. In addition to discovering the structure of benzene and hexachlorobenzene, Lonsdale worked on the synthesis of diamonds. She was a pioneer in the use of X-rays to study crystals. Lonsdale was one of the first two women elected a Fellow of the Royal Society (FRS) in 1945 (the other was the biochemist Marjory Stephenson).

In 1949 Lonsdale was appointed professor of chemistry and head of the Department of Crystallography at University College London. She was the first tenured woman professor at that college, a position she held until 1968 when she was named professor emeritus.

As a keen table tennis player, Lonsdale made use of ping pong balls to demonstrate the molecular structure to her students. One such model—of the silicate group —is in the Science Museum collection 

During her later career, she became interested in stones and minerals produced in the human body e.g. kidney stones or gall stones. Some of her crystallographic models are in the collection of the Science Museum in London.

Selected publications

Simplified Structure Factor and Electron Density Formulae for the 230 Space Groups of Mathematical Crystallography, G. Bell & Sons, London, 1936.
"Divergent Beam X-ray Photography of Crystals," Philosophical Transactions of the Royal Society 240A: 219 (1947).
Crystals and X-Rays, G. Bell & Sons, London, 1948.
“Human Stones”, Science Vol. 159, Issue 3820, pp. 1199-1207,  15 Mar 1968
 Quakers visit Russia, Edited by Kathleen Lonsdale : an account of a visit to the Soviet Union in July 1951 by seven British Quakers, 145 pages. Published by the East-West Relations Group of the Friends Peace Committee. Other authors: Margaret Ann Backhouse, B Leslie Metcalfe, Gerald Bailey, Paul S Cadbury, Mildred Creak, Frank Edmead.
Removing the Causes of War, 1953.
Is peace possible? (1957)
Forth in Thy Name: The Life and Work of Godfrey Mowatt (1959)

Personal life

After beginning her research career, in 1927 Yardley married Thomas Jackson Lonsdale. They had three children – Jane, Nancy, and Stephen. Stephen became a medical doctor and worked for several years in Nyasaland (now Malawi).

Pacifism
Though she had been brought up in the Baptist denomination as a child, Kathleen Lonsdale became a Quaker in 1935, simultaneously with her husband. Already committed pacifists, both were attracted to Quakerism for this reason. She was a Sponsor of the Peace Pledge Union.

She served a month in Holloway prison during the Second World War because she refused to register for civil defence duties, or to pay a fine for refusing to register. During this time she experienced a range of issues which would eventually result in Lonsdale becoming a prison reform activist and she joined the Howard League for Penal Reform.  "What I was not prepared for was the general insanity of an administrative system in which lip service is paid to the idea of segregation and the ideal of reform, when in practice the opportunities for contamination and infection are innumerable, and those responsible for re-education practically nil" In 1953, at the Yearly Meeting of the British Quakers, she delivered the keynote Swarthmore Lecture, under the title Removing the Causes of War. A self-identified Christian pacifist, she wrote about peaceful dialogue and was appointed the first secretary of Churches' Council of Healing by the Archbishop of Canterbury William Temple.

Death
Lonsdale died on 1 April 1971, aged 68, from an anaplastic cancer of unknown origin.

Legacy and honours 

Kathleen Lonsdale was elected an Honorary Member of the Women's Engineering Society in 1946 in recognition of her "brilliant and important work". 
1956, she was made Dame Commander of the Order of the British Empire.
1966, she was elected as the first woman president of the International Union of Crystallography. 
1967, active in encouraging young people to study science, she was elected as the first woman president of the British Association for the Advancement of Science.
There are buildings named in her honour at University College London, at the University of Limerick, and at Dublin City University.
1969, she was awarded an Honorary Degree (Doctor of Science) by the University of Bath.
Lonsdaleite, an allotrope of carbon, was named in her honour; it is a rare harder form of diamond found in meteorites.
A plaque was erected on Lonsdale's family home in Newbridge by the National Committee for Commemorative Plaques in Science and Technology in 2003, 100 years after her birth.
On 1 April 2021, English Heritage unveiled a blue plaque at her childhood home in 19 Colenso Road, Seven Kings, London where she lived from 1911 to 1927, aged 8–24.
 The Kathleen Lonsdale room at Friends House, London, UK is named after her.

References

External links
 Lonsdale Papers at University College London
 Science in the Making Kathleen Lonsdale's papers in the Royal Society's archives
Lonsdale's crystallographic models in the Science Museum, London - urea, magnesium ammonium phosphate and hydroxyapatite

British chemists
British physicists
British crystallographers
1903 births
1971 deaths
British women chemists
British women physicists
Academics of University College London
Academics of the University of Leeds
Alumni of Bedford College, London
Alumni of Royal Holloway, University of London
Alumni of University College London
British pacifists
British Quakers
Deaths from cancer in England
Converts to Quakerism
Dames Commander of the Order of the British Empire
Deaths from cancer of unknown primary origin
Female Fellows of the Royal Society
British Christian pacifists
People educated at Ilford County High School
People educated at Woodford County High School For Girls
People from Newbridge, County Kildare
Presidents of the British Science Association
20th-century British chemists
20th-century British physicists
20th-century British women scientists
Women's Engineering Society
20th-century Quakers
Presidents of the International Union of Crystallography